442 may refer to:

 442 (number)
 AD 442, a year in the 5th century of the Gregorian calendar
 442 BC, a year in the pre-Julian Roman calendar
Area code 442
4-4-2, a football formation

Astronomy
442 Eichsfeldia, a large asteroid

Media

Literature and publications
FourFourTwo, a football magazine

Music
4-4-2, a band formed to record the song "Come on England" for the England football team for the Euro 2004 championship
Stomp 442, an album by Anthrax

Television and video
442oons, a football animation parody YouTube channel
FourFourTwo (TV series), an Asian football TV series

Military

Canada
442 Transport and Rescue Squadron, of the Royal Canadian Air Force

United States
442d Bombardment Squadron, an inactive United States Air Force unit
442d Operations Group, an active United States Air Force Reserve unit
442d Tactical Fighter Training Squadron, an inactive United States Air Force unit
442nd Fighter Wing, an Air Reserve Component of the United States Air Force
442nd Infantry Regiment (United States) of the United States Army

Soviet Union
442nd Missile Brigade, of the Soviet Army

Transportation

Automobiles
Oldsmobile 442, an automobile produced beginning in the 1964 model year

Routes
List of highways numbered 442

Trains
4-4-2 (locomotive), a steam locomotive configuration in Whyte notation
British Rail Class 442, a British EMU train
New South Wales 442 class locomotive, a class of diesel locomotives